Magnolia is a rural locality in the Fraser Coast Region, Queensland, Australia. In the  Magnolia had a population of 130 people.

History 
Magnolia State School opened on 8 August 1917 and closed on 31 December 1963.

In the  Magnolia had a population of 130 people.

References 

Fraser Coast Region
Localities in Queensland